Šmaver is a settlement on the right bank of the Soča River north of Solkan in the Municipality of Nova Gorica in western Slovenia.

Name
Locally, Šmaver is known as Štamaver or Šentmaver.

History
The actual settlement of San Mauro remained in Italy, whereas the area of Šmaver with the eastern slopes of Mount Sabotin, now without any permanent residents, was annexed to the Socialist Federal Republic of Yugoslavia in 1947.

References

External links
Šmaver on Geopedia

Populated places in the City Municipality of Nova Gorica